Bierley is a hamlet on the Isle of Wight, UK. Bierley is in the south of the Isle of Wight, north of Niton and 0.7 miles to the west of Whitwell. Bierley is at the corner of Kingates Lane and Newport Road.

Bierley was the site of brickmaking operations in the past. The Prichetts, a local family involved in brickmaking, opened the Bierley brickyard in 1800.
In the 1901 Census the brickmaking operations are being run by William Scovell of Ryde

Public transport is provided by Southern Vectis bus route 6, running from Newport to Ventnor.

References

Hamlets on the Isle of Wight